Qeshlaq-e Qarah Darreh-ye Asam Khan Asad (also Romanized as Qeshlāq-e Qarah Darreh-ye Āsam Khān Āsad) is a village in Qeshlaq-e Sharqi Rural District, Qeshlaq Dasht District, Bileh Savar County, Ardabil Province, Iran. At the 2006 census, its population was 14, in 4 families.

References 

Populated places in Bileh Savar County
Towns and villages in Bileh Savar County